The UC Irvine Anteaters men's soccer program represents the University of California, Irvine in all NCAA Division I men's college soccer competitions. Founded in 1984, the Anteaters compete in the Big West Conference. The Anteaters are coached by Yossi Raz, who has coached the team since 2017 after previously coaching the Cal Poly Pomona Broncos and serving as an assistant for the Cal State Northridge Matadors. UC Irvine plays their home matches at Anteater Stadium.

Postseason

NCAA Tournament 
UC Irvine has appeared in six NCAA Tournaments. Their combined record is 4–6–1.

References

External links 

 

 
1984 establishments in California
Association football clubs established in 1984